The U.S. city of Mobile, Alabama is the site of 15 high-rises, all of which stand taller than . The tower is also the tallest building in the U.S. state of Alabama and the 62nd tallest in the United States. Mobile's second-tallest skyscraper, the RSA Trustmark Building, rises  and stood as the tallest structure in the city for over forty years. Overall, four of the ten tallest buildings in Alabama are located in Mobile. The city has more skyscrapers than any other city in Alabama besides Birmingham.

The history of high-rises in Mobile began with the completion of the 11-story Van Antwerp Building in 1907. The structure, often regarded as the first skyscraper in the city and the state, stood as the tallest building in the city until 1929, when the  Regions Bank Building took its place. Upon its completion in 1965, the RSA Trustmark Building surpassed the height of the Regions Bank Building and became the tallest building in Alabama. It held this title until 1986, when the  SouthTrust Tower was completed in Birmingham, but remained the tallest building in Mobile until the 2006 topping out of the RSA Battle House Tower.

As of August 2009, there are no high-rises under construction or proposed for construction in Mobile. A residential condominium project, Water Street Landing, was originally proposed in 2007 as a three-tower complex to be constructed on the Mobile River; the $45 million (USD) development was later canceled due to lack of funding. While the city of Mobile itself is not the location of any new high-rise developments, Orange Beach, a satellite city in the Mobile–Daphne–Fairhope combined statistical area, is the site of several construction proposals. One such proposal is the Mandalay Beach development, which includes two-twin residential towers that are planned to rise  and 36 stories each.

Tallest buildings
This includes spires and architectural details but does not include antenna masts. An equal sign (=) following a rank indicates the same height between two or more buildings. The "Year" column indicates the year in which a building was completed.

Timeline of tallest buildings
This table lists buildings that once held the title of tallest building in Mobile as well as the current titleholder, the RSA Battle House Tower.

See also

Notes
A. ^ This height is an estimate based on a diagram of the Regions Bank Building; official height figures have not been released by this building's developer.

References
General

Specific

External links
 Diagram of Mobile skyscrapers on SkyscraperPage

 
Mobile
Tallest, Mobile